Anthony Zboralski is a French hacker, artist and internet entrepreneur.

Computer hacking 
In 1994, Zboralski social engineered the FBI to connect to the internet and set up teleconferences with other hackers. Over a period of four months, Zboralski posed as its legal attaché in Paris, Thomas Baker, costing the FBI $250,000.

Zboralski was part of a group of hackers called w00w00. He went by the handles "gaius" and "kugutsumen".

Career 
From 2011 to 2013, Zboralski worked as a managing consultant for IOActive. In 2014, Zboralski co-founded Belua Systems Limited.

Television 
Surfez Couvert was a TV show co-written by Antoine Rivière and Zboralski in which Zboralski offered practical recommendations on how to protect our "life 2.0". It began airing on Game One in 2013 and was co-produced by Flair Production and MTV Networks France.

See also
Gameplay_of_Eve_Online#Developer_misconduct
Parmiter's School

References

External links

1975 births
Living people
French businesspeople
French male artists
People associated with computer security